was built by J.Elder & Co in Glasgow in 1882 and entered service with Thomas Skinner & Co., London in the tea trade from China. At 418.6 ft with a 50 ft beam, she measured 4,826 tons gross and 2,951 tons nett.

She held a long-standing record from the Tungshu Lightship to London with a time of 27 days and 4 hours. The cost of this was a very large coal consumption, variously reported at 150 and 180 tons per day. Her normal complement of firemen was 52, but on her record-breaking run she used 111 firemen - an indication of the massive amount of coal that was shovelled into the 36 furnaces that heated her boilers. Despite the higher freights that she could achieve with this speed, she was uneconomic to operate and was sold later in 1883.

Her new owner was an Italian company, La Veloce and she was re-fitted with accommodation for passengers and renamed .  She also kept the name .

Her first voyage from Genoa to South America under Italian flag began on 13 November 1883. In 1884, she was named SS Nord America only.

She was chartered by the British government in 1885 to carry troops to Suakin, Sudan and in 1899 the Russian government chartered her to carry troops between Odessa and Vladivostok in connection with the Boxer Rebellion.

In 1900, she was refitted by Palmers Shipbuilding and Iron Company and her engines were replaced, reducing her speed to only 13.5 knots.

Between 5 May 1901 and 25 March 1908, she made 58 round trips between Palermo, Naples and New York.

Beginning in 1909, she was used solely as a cargo steamer, and on 5 December 1910 carrying a shipment of horses from Buenos Aires, she ran aground off Morocco. She was re-floated and towed to Genoa, laid up and scrapped in 1911.

Notes

References

Bibliography

1882 ships
Maritime incidents in 1910
Passenger ships of Italy
Ships built in Glasgow
Steamships of Italy
Steamships of the United Kingdom
1882 establishments in Scotland